The Interstate Highway System in Louisiana consists of  of freeways constructed and maintained by the Louisiana Department of Transportation and Development (La DOTD).

The system was authorized on June 29, 1956 when President Dwight D. Eisenhower signed into law the Federal Aid Highway Act of 1956. The first road segment in the new system was officially opened and dedicated on February 24, 1960 and consisted of a portion of the Pontchartrain Expressway (I-10) in New Orleans. Two months later, the first Interstate Highway shields installed in Louisiana accompanied the opening of a portion of I-20 near Ruston on April 23.



Primary interstates

Auxiliary interstates

See also

References

External links

Maps / GIS Data Homepage, Louisiana Department of Transportation and Development

 
Interstate